Mikhail Matveevich Ivanov (Russian: Михаил Матвеевич Иванов ; 1748, Veliky Novgorod - 16 August 1823, St. Petersburg) was a Russian painter, watercolorist, and Academician.

Biography 
His father was a soldier in the Semyonovsky Regiment. In 1762, he and his brother,  were admitted to the Imperial Academy of Arts. He was awarded a silver medal in 1769, followed by a gold medal in 1770, for his landscape with staffage, depicting an olive tree with military paraphernalia, soldiers and shepherds. This also earned him a study trip to Western Europe.

In Paris he studied with Jean-Baptiste Le Prince, with whom he copied landscapes by the Old Masters. He was especially drawn to Dutch and Flemish artists.

In 1773, he and Arkhip went to Rome, where he painted landscapes en plein aire and copied more of the Old Masters, many of which he sent back to the Academy. By the time he returned to Russia, in 1779, he had travelled through Spain and Switzerland. Upon his return, the Academy recognized him as a candidate for the title of "Academician".

In 1780, he was assigned to accompany Prince Grigory Potemkin and, per the Prince's instructions, paint all places and events that were in any way "remarkable". He made numerous drawings and watercolors throughout Crimea and the Caucasus, as well as battle scenes, depicting the Siege of Ochakov (1788) and the Siege of Izmail (1790). It was during this time, in 1785, that he was finally named an Academician. His last work on this assignment was a depiction of Potemkin's death in Bessarabia (1791), which was engraved by Gavriil Skorodumov and widely distributed.

After that, he returned to St. Petersburg and served as curator at the Hermitage Museum. In 1792, he married Skorodumov's widow, Maria Ivanovna. From 1800, he taught classes in battle painting at the Academy. From 1804, he also taught landscape painting.

References

Further reading 
 Aleksei Fedorov-Davydov, Михаил Матвеевич Иванов, State Publishing House, Moscow, 1950
 S. N. Kondakov, Юбилейный справочник Императорской Академии художеств. 1764—1914 (Anniversary directory of the Imperial Academy of Arts), Golike and Vilborg, 1914–1915, Part II, pg.80
 "Progenitor of the Crimean Landscape", (Mikhail Matveevich Ivanov - battle painter at the general staff) by Tatyana Shorokhova @ Журнальный мир

External links

 Biography and works @ Artsait
 "Travel albums of Mikhail Matveyevich Ivanov in the collection of the Russian Museum", by Olga Kaparulina @ Nasledie

1748 births
1823 deaths
Russian painters
Russian landscape painters
Military art
Imperial Academy of Arts alumni
People from Veliky Novgorod